José Antonio Sánchez de Luna (born October 18, 1984)  is a former Spanish professional tennis player. He is currently director of the NES Campus Tennis Club in Granada, and works with youth sports education programmes.

ATP tournaments finals

Titles (6)

References

External links
 
 

Spanish male tennis players
Sportspeople from Granada
1984 births
Living people
Tennis players from Andalusia